The governor of Davao del Sur, is the chief executive of the provincial government of Davao del Sur.

Provincial Governors (1967-Present)

References

Governors of Davao del Sur
Davao del Sur